Natural Bridge is a town at the southwest edge of Winston County, Alabama, United States, located near the intersection of U.S. Route 278, Alabama Highway 13, and Alabama State Route 5. It initially incorporated on September 3, 1914. In the 1930s, due to a dwindling population, its charter became dormant. On July 24, 1997 it reincorporated.

The population was 37 at the 2010 census, up from 28 in 2000. After its reincorporation, in 2000 it was the least populated town in Alabama that was incorporated, although Gantts Quarry had a population of zero but was still legally incorporated. In 2010, it lost the title to McMullen and became the 4th least populated incorporated town in the state.

Description
The town is notable for the nearby rock arch, also named Natural Bridge, the longest natural bridge east of the Rockies, spanning over 127 ft (40 m). The arch is in Natural Bridge Park, which allows public access.

Geography
Natural Bridge is located at  (34.091713, -87.604523).

Demographics

As of the census of 2000, there were 28 people, 11 households, and 7 families residing in the town. The racial makeup of the town was 100.00% White.

There were 11 households, out of which 27.3% had children under the age of 18 living with them, 45.5% were married couples living together, 27.3% had a female householder with no husband present, and 27.3% were non-families. 27.3% of all households were made up of individuals, and 18.2% had someone living alone who was 65 years of age or older. The average household size was 2.55 and the average family size was 2.75.

In the town, the population was spread out, with 25.0% under the age of 18, 7.1% from 18 to 24, 28.6% from 25 to 44, 21.4% from 45 to 64, and 17.9% who were 65 years of age or older. The median age was 40 years. For every 100 females, there were 75.0 males. For every 100 females age 18 and over, there were 61.5 males.

The median income for a household in the town was $11,875, and the median income for a family was $10,625. Males had a median income of $21,250 versus $13,750 for females. The per capita income for the town was $4,619. There were 63.6% of families and 62.2% of the population living below the poverty line, including 66.7% of under eighteens and 71.4% of those over 64.

See also

 List of cities and towns in Alabama

References

External links

 

Towns in Alabama
Towns in Winston County, Alabama